Bruno Flierl (born 2 February 1927 in Bolesławiec, Prussia) is a German architect, architecture critic, and writer. He is considered one of the most important figures in the architecture and city planning of East Germany. He assisted in the design of the Pariser Platz and argued for the preservation of the Palace of the Republic in the debate over the restoration of the Berlin Palace. 

He fought in World War II and was in French war captivity until 1947. In 1948, he began studying architecture at the Berlin University of the Arts. A dedicated communist, he took up residence in East Germany in 1952. In 1953, he graduated from the Bauhaus University, Weimar. From 1962 to 1964 he was editor in chief of the magazine . Since the magazine also published articles critical of city planning in East Germany, Flierl came into conflict with the Socialist Unity Party of Germany, and was forced to leave. He gained a doctorate at the Bauakademie der DDR in 1972. He taught at the Humboldt-Universität zu Berlin beginning in 1980.

References

External links
 Gestaltungssatzung für den Pariser Platz mit Walter Rolfes 
 Kritik von Flierl an dem von Harald Bodenschatz, Jörn Düwel, Niels Gutschow und Hans Stimmann geschriebenem Buch Berlin und seine Bauten
 Zur Neuaneignung verlorener Orte der Stadt durch gebaute Symbole Analyse von Flierl über den Wiederaufbau des Berliner Schlosses und des Ground Zeros in New York für die Architektur-Zeitschrift der TU Cottbus
 »Die DDR hat kein ›anderes Berlin‹ gebaut« Interview in Junge Welt vom 28. Januar 2017
 Portraitfilm mit Architekturkritiker Bruno Flierl

1927 births
Living people
Berlin University of the Arts alumni
Academic staff of the Humboldt University of Berlin
Bauhaus University, Weimar alumni